Luke Hemsworth (born 5 November 1980) is an Australian actor who is known for his roles as Nathan Tyson in the TV series Neighbours and as Ashley Stubbs in the HBO sci-fi series Westworld.

He is the older brother of actors Chris Hemsworth and Liam Hemsworth.

Early life
Hemsworth was born in Melbourne, the eldest son of Leonie ( van Os), an English teacher and Craig Hemsworth, a social services counselor. His younger brothers are actors Chris and Liam Hemsworth. His maternal grandfather is a Dutch immigrant and his other ancestry is Irish, English, Scottish and German.

Career
Hemsworth trained in acting at the National Institute of Dramatic Art. In 2001, he started his career on the Australian soap opera Neighbours as Nathan Tyson. Mainly a television actor, Hemsworth has appeared in TV series such as The Saddle Club, Blue Heelers, Last Man Standing, All Saints,  Satisfaction and Westworld.  In 2012, he starred in the six part miniseries Bikie Wars: Brothers in Arms as Gregory "Shadow" Campbell. He is set to star in the upcoming Australian war film The 34th Battalion as Robinson. He played the character Caleb Duran in the 2019 film Crypto, which follows the life of a family that gets embroiled in a crypto conspiracy involving Russian mafia.

In 2018, Hemsworth was selected as the newest face of Tourism Australia and appeared in a Dundee ad.

Filmography

Film

Television

References

External links

 

1980 births
Living people
Male actors from Melbourne
21st-century Australian male actors
Australian male models
Australian male television actors
Models from Melbourne
Australian people of Dutch descent
Australian people of Irish descent
Australian people of English descent
Australian people of Scottish descent
Australian people of German descent
Luke